Želva is a town in Ukmergė district municipality, Vilnius County, east Lithuania. According to the Lithuanian census of 2011, the town has a population of 457 people.

History
The town has a Catholic church and a synagogue. Želva is the birthplace of Nobel Prize in Chemistry winner Aaron Klug.

On July 26 and 27, 1941, the Jews of the town were murdered in a mass execution perpetrated by an Einsatzgruppen and local Lithuanian collaborators. 60 people were killed.

See also
Pazelva, former village near Želva

References

Towns in Vilnius County
Towns in Lithuania
Vilkomirsky Uyezd
Holocaust locations in Lithuania
Ukmergė District Municipality